Arseny Nikolayevich Koreshchenko (18 December 1870 – 6 January 1921) was a Russian pianist and composer of classical music, including operas and ballets.

Biography
Koreshchenko was born in Moscow in 1870. He entered the Moscow Conservatory, graduating in 1891. He was only the second person ever to be awarded the Conservatory's Great Gold Medal; the first was one of his teachers, Sergei Taneyev, and the third was Sergei Rachmaninoff.  He also studied theory under Anton Arensky.

He stayed with his alma mater as a professor of harmony and also taught counterpoint at the Moscow Synodal School.

He died in Kharkov in 1921.

List of works

Opera
Belshazzar's Feast, Op. 7 (1 act, produced Moscow, 1892)
The Angel of Death, Op. 10 (2 acts, based on Mikhail Lermontov)
The Ice Palace, Op. 38 (based on Ivan Lazhechnikov's play; produced Moscow 1900)

Ballet
The Magic Mirror, Op. 39

Incidental music
The Trojan Women (Euripides), Op. 15
Iphigenia in Aulis (Euripides), Op. 18

Choral works
Don Juan, cantata, Op. 5
Armenian Songs, Op. 8
Prologue for the 25th anniversary of the Moscow Conservatory, Op. 9
Armenian Songs, Op. 13
Georgian Songs, Op. 27c
other (Opp. 16, 29, 32, 37)

Orchestral
Barcarolle, Op. 6
A Tale, Op. 11
Scène poétique, Op. 12
Two Symphonic Sketches, Op. 14
Armenian Suite, Op. 20  (also arranged for piano 4 hands)
Scènes nocturnes, Op. 21
Symphony No. 1 Lyric, Op. 23
Musical Picture, Op. 27a

Concertante
Concert Fantasy in D minor, for piano and orchestra (or two pianos), Op. 3  (pub. 1895)

Chamber
String Quartet, Op. 25
Two pieces for Cello and Piano, Op. 34  (?1898, ded. Anatoliy Brandukov)  (1. Sonnet d’amour, A major;  2. Barcarolle, A minor)

Piano
Trois Morceaux, Op. 1  (1893)  (1. Berceuse; 2. Étude; 3. Polonaise)
Suite Armeniènne, Op. 20 (5 pieces)  (arr. of the orchestral suite for pf duet and pf solo by the composer, pub. 1897)  (1. Au ruisseau (Lento non troppo); 2. Scherzo (Allegro moderato); 3. Tempo di valse; 4. Danse armenienne (Allegretto grazioso e non troppo); 5. Finale (Lesghinka) (Allegro ma non troppo))
Scènes Enfantines, Op. 22  (6 pieces, 1898, ded. Josef Hoffman)  (1. L'ogre; 2. Petit scherzo; 3. Petite marche; 4. Complainte; 5. Menuet; 6. Valse à la Neapolitaine)
Quatre Morceaux, Op. 30 (1897) (1. Nocturne; 2. Gavotte; 3. Rapsodie Georgiènne No. 1; 4. Rapsodie Georgiènne No. 2)
Morceaux Caractéristiques, Op. 40  (1904, ded. Alexander Goldenweiser)  (1. Prélude; 2. Intermezzo; 3. Aveu; 4. Barcarolle; 5. Une page de mes mémoires; 6. Quéstion douloureuse; 7. Impromptu)
Piano Pieces, Op. 47  (1915)  (of which no. 7 is an Impromptu, A flat major)
other (Opp. 19, 33)

Songs
about 80 songs (Opp. 2, 26, 28, 31, 35, 36)

Sources
Eric Blom, ed., Grove's Dictionary of Music and Musicians, 5th ed., 1954

References

External links

1870 births
1921 deaths
Russian male classical composers
Russian pianists
19th-century pianists
Male pianists
19th-century male musicians
19th-century classical composers
20th-century pianists
20th-century Russian male musicians
20th-century classical composers
Russian opera composers
Male opera composers
Russian ballet composers
Musicians from Moscow
Moscow Conservatory alumni